The River Edge Elementary School District is a community public school district that serves students in pre-kindergarten through sixth grade from River Edge, in Bergen County, New Jersey, United States.

As of the 2021–22 school year, the district, comprised of two schools, had an enrollment of 1,164 students and 96.0 classroom teachers (on an FTE basis), for a student–teacher ratio of 12.1:1.

The district is classified by the New Jersey Department of Education as being in District Factor Group "I", the second-highest of eight groupings. District Factor Groups organize districts statewide to allow comparison by common socioeconomic characteristics of the local districts. From lowest socioeconomic status to highest, the categories are A, B, CD, DE, FG, GH, I and J.

River Edge and neighboring Oradell share a combined public school district for seventh through twelfth grades, River Dell Regional School District which was established in 1958. As of the 2021–22 school year, the high school district, comprised of two schools, had an enrollment of 1,606 students and 140.2 classroom teachers (on an FTE basis), for a student–teacher ratio of 11.5:1. Schools in the district (with 2021–22 enrollment data from the National Center for Education Statistics) are 
River Dell Regional Middle School in River Edge (with 589 students in grades 7-8) and 
River Dell Regional High School in Oradell (with 999 students in grades 9-12).

Awards and recognition
During the 1998-99 school year, Cherry Hill School received the Blue Ribbon Award from the United States Department of Education, the highest honor that an American school can achieve.

Schools 
River Edge has a preschool along with two primary schools, both of which serve students in first through sixth grade. Schools in the district (with 2021–22 enrollment data from the National Center for Education Statistics) are:
New Bridge Center (NA; PreK-K)
Eric James, Assistant Principal
Cherry Hill School (698 students in grades 1-6) which is on the south side of the borough.
Denise Heitman, Principal
Roosevelt School (472 students in grades 1-6) which is located on the north side of the borough.
Michael Henzel, Principal

Curriculum review is an ongoing process in River Edge. Current educational research, the New Jersey Core Curriculum Content Standards, as well as national subject standards are used in the curriculum development. This process ensures that each curricular area is comprehensive and reflects current educational thought.

The district's per pupil comparable costs are below average while teachers salaries are above the statewide median cost.

Administration 
Core members of the district's administration are:
Cathy Danahy, Superintendent of Schools
Louise Napolitano, School Business Administrator / Board Secretary

Board of education
The district's board of education, comprised of seven members, sets policy and oversees the fiscal and educational operation of the district through its administration. As a Type II school district, the board's trustees are elected directly by voters to serve three-year terms of office on a staggered basis, with either two or three seats up for election each year held (since 2012) as part of the November general election. The board appoints a superintendent to oversee the day-to-day operation of the district.

References

External links 
River Edge Elementary School District

School Data for the River Edge Elementary School District, National Center for Education Statistics
River Dell Regional School District

River Edge, New Jersey
New Jersey District Factor Group I
School districts in Bergen County, New Jersey